Mikaela Valtersson (born 6 January 1967) is a Swedish Green Party politician. She was a member of the Riksdag from 2002 until 2011.

External links
Mikaela Valtersson at the Riksdag website

Members of the Riksdag from the Green Party
Living people
1967 births
Women members of the Riksdag
Members of the Riksdag 2002–2006
Members of the Riksdag 2006–2010
Members of the Riksdag 2010–2014
21st-century Swedish women politicians